The men's ice hockey tournament at the 1956 Winter Olympics in Cortina d'Ampezzo, Italy, was the eighth Olympic Championship, also serving as the 23rd World Championships and the 34th European Championships.  The tournament was held at the Olympic Ice Stadium and the Apollonio Stadium.

East and West Germany could not come to an agreement over how to formulate a combined team, so they played a qualification game against each other, which the west won.  The east hosted a tournament for non qualified teams, often referred to as World Championships Pool B,  between GDR, Norway and Belgium in Berlin.

The Soviets won all their games to claim their first Olympic title, their second World title, and their third European title.  Canada, represented by the Kitchener-Waterloo Dutchmen, won its eighth consecutive Olympic ice hockey medal, and first bronze medal.

Medalists

Participating nations

World Championship Group A (Italy)

Qualification
November 16, 1955
East Germany 3-7 West Germany

First round
Top two teams (shaded ones) from each group earned a right to play for 1st-6th places.

Group A

January 26
Canada 4–0 Germany (UTG)
Italy 2–2 Austria
January 27
Italy 2–2 Germany (UTG)
Canada 23–0 Austria
January 28
Germany (UTG) 7–0 Austria
Italy 1–3 Canada

Group B

January 27
Czechoslovakia 4–3 USA
January 28
USA 4–0 Poland
January 29
Czechoslovakia 8–3 Poland

Group C

January 27
USSR 5–1 Sweden
January 28
Sweden 6–5 Switzerland
January 29
USSR 10–3 Switzerland

Final round

The first place team, the Soviet Union, won the gold medal; the silver medal was won by the United States, and the bronze medal was won by Canada.

Coming into the final game of the tournament (Soviet Union vs Canada), the Soviets and Americans both had eight points while Canada had six points. A Canadian win would have created a three-way tie at eight points, to be broken by goal ratio. Canada (23/9=2.556) needed a victory by three or more to pass the Soviets (23/5=4.600). The Soviets would remain ahead of Canada with a win, a draw, or a loss by one or two. 

The Americans (26/12=2.167) still had a chance at all three medal places due to the possibility of the goal ratios of Canada and/or the Soviets being sufficiently reduced according to the score of the final game.

January 30
USA 7–2 Germany (UTG)
Canada 6–3 Czechoslovakia
USSR 4–1 Sweden
January 31
USSR 8–0 Germany (UTG)
Sweden 5–0 Czechoslovakia
USA 4–1 Canada
February 1
USA 6–1 Sweden
February 2
Canada 10–0 Germany (UTG)
USSR 7–4 Czechoslovakia
February 3
Czechoslovakia 9–3 Germany (UTG)
Canada 6–2 Sweden
USSR 4–0 USA
February 4
USSR 2–0 Canada
Germany (UTG) 1–1 Sweden
USA 9–4 Czechoslovakia

Consolation round

January 31
Switzerland 7–4 Austria
February 1
Poland 6–2 Switzerland
Italy 8–2 Austria
February 2
Italy 8–3 Switzerland
Poland 4–3 Austria
February 3
Italy 5–2 Poland

World Championship Group B (East Germany)

Final Round

March 8
East Germany 4–1 Norway
March 9
East Germany 14–7 Belgium
March 10
Norway 7–5 Belgium

Statistics

Average age
Gold medalists team USSR was the oldest team in the tournament, averaging 29 years and 11 months. Team USA was the youngest team in the tournament, averaging 22 years and 5 months. Tournament average was 26 years and 7 months.

Leading scorers

Tournament awards
 Best players selected by the directorate:
 Best Goaltender:  Willard Ikola
Best Defenceman:  Nikolai Sologubov
Best Forward:  Jack McKenzie

Final ranking

European Championship final ranking

Citations

References

 Jeux Olympiques d'Cortina d'Ampezzo 1956

 
1956 Winter Olympics events
Ice hockey at the Winter Olympics
Olympics, Winter
IIHF Men's World Ice Hockey Championships
International ice hockey competitions hosted by Italy